Sotirios Notaris (1879 – 1924) was a Greek fencer. He competed in three events at the 1912 Summer Olympics.

References

1879 births
1924 deaths
Greek male fencers
Olympic fencers of Greece
Fencers at the 1912 Summer Olympics